Lieutenant-General Ronald Morce Weeks, 1st Baron Weeks  (13 November 1890 – 19 August 1960) was a British Army general during the Second World War.

Military career

Weeks was commissioned into the South Lancashire Regiment of the Territorial Army in 1913. He served in the Rifle Brigade during the First World War and then retired from military service in 1919.

He was re-employed during the Second World War, initially as Chief of Staff for the Territorial Division and then as a brigadier on the General Staff of Home Forces in 1940. He was promoted to acting major-general on 17 March 1941 and was appointed Director General of Army Equipment in 1941 and Deputy Chief of the Imperial General Staff in 1942. He then became Deputy Military Governor and Chief of Staff of the British Zone for the Allied Control Council in Germany in 1945; in that capacity he was involved in negotiations to avoid the Berlin Blockade. He retired from the British Army later that year.

He was awarded the Military Cross (MC) in 1917, and a Bar to the MC in 1918. The citation for his MC reads:

He was appointed to the Distinguished Service Order (DSO) in 1918, made a Commander of the Order of the British Empire (CBE) in 1939 and a Knight Commander of the Order of the Bath (KCB) in 1943. He was also mentioned in dispatches three times for his service during the First World War.

Later life
After the war, Weeks became Chairman of Vickers. In 1956 he was raised to the peerage as Baron Weeks, of Ryton in the County Palatine of Durham.

Marriages and children
Weeks married Evelyn Elsie Haynes on 21 April 1922.  They were divorced in 1930. On 3 February 1931, he married Cynthia Mary Irvine.  With his second wife he had two daughters:

 Hon Pamela Rose Weeks (1931–2019), married Henry Walter Plunkett-Ernle-Erle-Drax (1928–2017) and had five sons including Richard Grosvenor Plunkett-Ernle-Erle-Drax MP
 Hon Venetia Daphne Weeks (1933), married Sir Peter Troubridge, 6th baronet (1927–1988)

Weeks died on 19 August 1960, aged 69, when, in the absence of male heirs, the barony became extinct.

References

Bibliography

External links
Generals of World War II

1960 deaths
1890 births
Military personnel from County Durham
British Army lieutenant generals
British Army generals of World War II
Knights Commander of the Order of the Bath
Commanders of the Order of the British Empire
Companions of the Distinguished Service Order
Recipients of the Military Cross
Rifle Brigade officers
Hereditary barons created by Elizabeth II
British Army personnel of World War I
South Lancashire Regiment officers
People from Durham, England
People educated at Charterhouse School